Basketball was first included in the Commonwealth Games in the 2006 games in Melbourne and returned as part of the 2018 Commonwealth Games on the Gold Coast.

Following the 2018 Games, regular full-court basketball was replaced as an optional Commonwealth Games sport by the 3x3 variation of the sport. This will make its debut at the 2022 Commonwealth Games, with both able-bodied and wheelchair competitions taking place.

History
In 2006 in Melbourne, Australia won the first ever Commonwealth Games Gold Medals in both the men's and women's competitions. New Zealand's teams and England's teams won the Silver and Bronze Medals respectively.

It was announced in 2011 that Basketball would return to the games at the 2018 Games on the Gold Coast. A total of 16 teams (8 men and 8 women) are scheduled to compete in 2018.

Although Canada, one of the strongest basketball nations in the world, did not enter a men's or women's team in 2006, it did so in both tournaments in 2018.

In August 2017, it was announced that 3x3 basketball would be part of the 2022 Commonwealth Games in Birmingham.

Commonwealth Basketball Championships
Although basketball has only been a part of the Commonwealth Games programme twice, there have been Commonwealth Basketball Championships held.

In 1978 the first such competition was co-hosted by England, Wales and Scotland.

In 2010 the Commonwealth Basketball Championships were due to be held in New Delhi, the venue for the 2010 Commonwealth Games. However, in February 2010 FIBA cancelled the event, on the grounds that the international calendar was too crowded.

Venues 
  Melbourne 2006: Ballarat Minerdome, Bendigo Stadium, Geelong Arena, Traralgon Sports Stadium and Melbourne Park Multi-Purpose Venue, Victoria
  Gold Coast 2018: Cairns Convention Centre, Townsville Entertainment and Convention Centre and Gold Coast Convention and Exhibition Centre, Queensland
  Birmingham 2022: Smithfield, West Midlands

Men's tournaments

Performance by nations

Women's tournaments

Performance by nations

3x3 tournaments

Men's tournaments

Women's tournaments

Men's Wheelchair tournaments

Women's Wheelchair tournaments

All-time medal table
Updated after the 2022 Commonwealth Games

Medal leaders by athlete

References

 
Sports at the Commonwealth Games
Commonwealth Games